This is a list of all the International team golfers who have played in the Presidents Cup through 2022. The International Team represents the rest of the world excluding the United States (the opponents) and Europe (which plays the United States in the Ryder Cup). Adam Scott holds the record number of appearances with ten. Ernie Els and Scott jointly hold the record for most points with 21.

Players

 + Selected or qualified for the team but withdrew and was replaced.

Playing record 
Source: 

O = Overall, S = Singles matches, Fs = Foursome matches, Fb = Fourball matches
W = Matches won, L = Matches lost, H = Matches halved

Record International appearances

Record International point winners

International appearances by country

See also
List of American Presidents Cup golfers
Lists of golfers

References

External links
About.com golf Presidents Cup Records

Presidents Cup
Presidents Cup, International
International Presidents Cup